Bitana is a town in Sarpang District in southern Bhutan.

References

External links
Satellite map at Maplandia.com

Populated places in Bhutan